Baba Kola (also Romanized as Bābā Kolā; also known as Bābā Kalā) is a village in Garmab Rural District, Chahardangeh District, Sari County, Mazandaran Province, Iran. At the 2006 census, its population was 283, in 58 families.

References 

Populated places in Sari County